Abdellah Debbari (born 6 January 1993) is an Algerian footballer who plays as a defender for ASO Chlef.

Carrer 
In 2023, he joined ASO Chlef.

References

External links
 
 

Living people
1993 births
ES Sétif players
Association football defenders
Algerian footballers
MO Béjaïa players
USM El Harrach players